Loukas Papaioannou (Arachova, 1831 – Athens, 1890) was a distinguished Greek university professor and physician. He was one of the founders of the study of anatomy in Greece. He was twice mayor of Arachova.

References

External links 
 Loukas Papaioannou in Pandektis, of the National Hellenic Research Foundation.

Mayors of places in Greece
Academic staff of the National and Kapodistrian University of Athens
Greek anatomists
National and Kapodistrian University of Athens alumni
People from Boeotia
1831 births
1890 deaths
19th-century Greek scientists